Asbury Churchwell Latimer (July 31, 1851February 20, 1908) was a United States representative and Senator from South Carolina. Born near Lowndesville, South Carolina, he attended the common schools, engaged in agricultural pursuits, and in 1880 moved to Belton, South Carolina and devoted his time to farming.

Latimer was elected as a Democrat to the Fifty-third and to the four succeeding Congresses (March 4, 1893 – March 3, 1903).  He did not seek renomination in 1902, having become a candidate for US Senator. He was elected to the U.S. Senate and served from March 4, 1903, until his death in 1908.

During his service in the Senate, he was appointed in 1907 a member of the United States Immigration Commission.

He died of peritonitis in Washington, D.C. in 1908; interment was in Belton Cemetery, Belton, South Carolina.

See also
List of United States Congress members who died in office (1900–49)

References

External links

 
 Asbury Churchwell Latimer, late a senator from South Carolina, Memorial addresses delivered in the House of Representatives and Senate frontispiece 1909

1851 births
1908 deaths
Deaths from peritonitis
Democratic Party United States senators from South Carolina
Democratic Party members of the United States House of Representatives from South Carolina
19th-century American politicians